Coptobasoides comoralis is a moth in the family Crambidae. It was described by Viette in 1960. It is found on the Comoros.

References

Moths described in 1960
Pyraustinae